Icon is a compilation album by British multi-instrumentalist Mike Oldfield. It was released on 31 May 2012 in Europe. It is part of a series of similar Icon albums released by Universal Music Enterprises.

The album includes selections from Oldfield's recorded output with Mercury Records. Pieces from earlier in Oldfield's career were originally released on Virgin Records but have been subsequently moved to Mercury/Universal.

The album was released during the same year as another Mike Oldfield compilation from Universal, Two Sides.

Track listing

References 

2012 compilation albums
Mike Oldfield compilation albums
Mercury Records compilation albums